Fu'ad Nassar (born 1914 in Nazareth), was a Palestinian communist leader. Nassar became associated with the anti-colonial struggle in 1929. He joined the Palestinian Communist Party and was in charge of the military activities of the party during the 1936-1939 insurgency. Led the Nazareth branch of the Palestinian Arab Workers Society.

Nassar was imprisoned in Iraq. He returned to Palestine in 1943. With the Palestine Communist Party in crumbles, he and other younger Arab communist leaders took the initiative to form the National Liberation League. Nassar became the General Secretary of the League. In 1944 the Nazareth branch of the Palestinian Arab Workers Society broke away from the mother organization. In the same year, he helped establish the Arab language newspaper Al-Ittihad.

When remaining West Bank elements of the League merged into the Jordanian Communist Party in 1951, Nassar became general secretary in the Jordanian party. He was arrested on December 29, 1951 and sentenced to ten year imprisonment. He was released by the Nabulsi government in 1956, but he had to leave Jordan soon thereafter as King Hussein stepped up repression against communists forces.

With Nassar in exile, a power struggle emerged within the party. The acting general secretary inside Jordan, Fatim as-Salifi, was more prone towards seeking reconciliation with the government. Whilst the sector loyal to as-Salfiti party promoted non-military struggles against Israel, Nassar argued that communists should actively take part in the liberation struggle. Moreover, he opposed United Nations Security Council Resolution 242. He formed the Ansar Forces, a Palestinian communist militia 1970, under joint command of the Jordanian, Syrian and Iraqi parties. The Ansar Forces lasted for three years, and in practice received little assistance from the Jordanian Communist Party.

In January 1973, Nassar was the first communist to be adopted into the Palestinian National Council. Nassar died in 1976.

References

1914 births
1976 deaths
People from Nazareth
Palestine Liberation Organization members
Palestine Communist Party politicians
Jordanian Communist Party politicians
National Liberation League in Palestine politicians
Palestinian people imprisoned abroad
Prisoners and detainees of Iraq